The nhaA-II RNA motif is a conserved RNA structure that was discovered by bioinformatics.
nhaA-II motifs are found in Caulobacterales.

nhaA-II motif RNAs likely function as cis-regulatory elements, in view of their positions upstream of protein-coding genes.  nhaA-I RNAs typically occur upstream of genes that encode exchangers of sodium ions and protons.  More rarely, they also exist upstream of methyltransferases that use S-adenosylmethionine as a donor.

References

Non-coding RNA